Prince Guduza Dlamini is the Speaker of the House of Assembly of Swaziland from December 2006 to June 2013. He is a member of the House of Dlamini and the brother of Mswati III of Eswatini. He was a member of the Senate of Swaziland from 1993 to 2003. He held several ministerial portfolios during that time.

References

Year of birth missing (living people)
Living people
Swazi royalty
Speakers of the House of Assembly of Eswatini
Place of birth missing (living people)
Members of the Senate of Eswatini
Sons of kings